See also 1701 in piracy, other events in 1702, 1703 in piracy, and Timeline of piracy.

Events

Indian Ocean
Winter - John Bowen's pirates seize the ship Speedy Return, commanded by Captain Drummond, at Maritan in Madagascar.

Deaths

Piracy
Piracy by year
1702 in military history